Chaker or Chakar in Iran may refer to:
 Chaker Bazar
 Chaker Zehi